Mexico competed in the 2021 Junior Pan American Games in Cali–Valle, Colombia from November 25 to December 5, 2021.

Medalist 

| width="78%" align="left" valign="top" |

| width="22%" align="left" valign="top" |

Competitors 
The following is the list of number of competitors (per gender) participating at the games per sport/discipline.

Archery 

Men's

Artistic swimming

Athletics

Track & road events 
 Men

 Women

Mixed

Field events 
Men's

Women's

Track & Field 
Men's

Women's

Badminton

3x3 Basquetball

Team Tournaments

Individual Trial

Beach Volleyball

Bowling

Boxing

Canoeing 
Men's

Women's

Cycling

Road

Track 
Sprint and Pursuit

Keirin

Madison

Omnium

Mountain

BMX

Diving

Fencing

Gymnastics

Artistic 
Men's events

Women's events

Rhythmic

Trampoline

Handball

Men's 
Summary

Squad

Group A

Group Play

5–8th place semifinals

Fifth place game

Women's 
Summary

Squad

Group A

Group Play

5–8th place semifinals

Fifth place game

Judo

Karate

Modern Pentathlon

Roller Sports

Artistic skating

Skateboarding

Speed skating

Rowing

Sailing

Softball 
Summary
Shooting

Team roster

|align="left" valign="top" |
Pool Play

| valign="top" |
Super Round

Gold Medal Match

Squash

Swimming 
Men's

Women's

Mixed

Table Tennis 
Singles and Doubles

Team

Taekwondo

Tennis

Triathlon

Volleyball

Men's 
Summary

Squad

Group play

Semifinals

Gold Medal Match

Individual awards

Women's 
Summary

Squad

Group play

5–8th Place Final

Individual awards

Weightlifting

Wrestling

References 

Nations at the 2021 Junior Pan American Games